Gelenipsa is a monotypic moth genus of the family Noctuidae. Its only species, Gelenipsa psychodidarum, is found in Panama. Both the genus and species were first described by Harrison Gray Dyar Jr. in 1914.

References

Acontiinae
Monotypic moth genera